1+1 is a 1972 album by Grin, featuring songs by their guitarist Nils Lofgren. As well as being an album in its own right, this was released by CBS in the UK as part of a 1976 double album set along with its predecessor Grin. The original LP was a gatefold. It had a photo of Nils on the front, with Bob & Bob on the back. The inside features triple exposure photos of the band members performing, giving the impression of motion. The Sides are not labelled 1 & 2. The first side is labelled "Rockin' Side" and the flip side is labelled "Dreamy Side".

Track listing

Personnel
Grin
 Nils Lofgren – guitars, keyboards, vocals
 Bob Berberich – drums, vocals
 Bob Gordon – bass, vocals
with:
 Graham Nash – vocals on "Hi, Hello Home"
 David Blumberg – orchestration on "Just a Poem" and "Soft Fun"

Technical 
 Photography – Ed Caraeff
 Design – Wayne Kimbell
 Distributed by CBS Records

References

 All information from album cover and label, unless otherwise noted. 1+1, Grin, Spindizzy Z 31038 (1972) LP

1972 albums
Nils Lofgren albums
Albums produced by David Briggs (producer)
Epic Records albums
Albums recorded at Wally Heider Studios